George Hildreth House is located in Lower Township, Cape May County, New Jersey, United States. The house was built in 1850 and added to the National Register of Historic Places on July 28, 1999.

See also
National Register of Historic Places listings in Cape May County, New Jersey

References

Houses on the National Register of Historic Places in New Jersey
Gothic Revival architecture in New Jersey
Houses completed in 1850
Houses in Cape May County, New Jersey
Lower Township, New Jersey
National Register of Historic Places in Cape May County, New Jersey
New Jersey Register of Historic Places